Badshahi Haveli is an historic building in Naya Bazar, Ajmer in India.

It was built in 1507 on the order of Emperor Akbar. Rectangular in shape, the building has a pillared hall inside. The Haveli has rooms on all the four corners and can be entered via the eastern verandah. The Haveli was used by one of the Amirs of Akbar as a residence later.

References 

Buildings and structures in Ajmer
Buildings and structures completed in 1507
1507 establishments in India
Havelis